Gnome Ranger is a text adventure game designed by Peter Austin and released by Level 9 in 1987. The Atari 8-bit family and Apple II ports are text-only. The disk version for other systems includes still graphic images to accompany the text.  A sequel was published in 1988: Ingrid's Back.

Plot
The gnome Ingrid Bottomlow has displeased her family by her un-gnomelike behaviour, such as going off to university and getting an education. She has been teleported from her village by a faulty scroll, and must find her way back…

Gameplay

The game is a  text adventure with limited graphics on some systems. It comes with a short novella by Peter McBride ("The Gnettlefield Journal") explaining Ingrid's predicament and setting the background to the story. Gameplay is similar to the earlier Level 9 adventure Knight Orc, which uses the same game engine (KAOS). The player must explore the settings while collecting useful items and interacting with various non-player characters to solve puzzles and problems.

The game takes place in three areas, each characterized by the non-player characters Ingrid will meet. The first contains characters of an animal nature, the second of a vegetable nature, and the third of a mineral nature.

Reception
Gnome Ranger received mostly positive reviews. Atari ST User magazine reviewer rated it 9/10 points overall, concluding: "I am convinced it is Level 9's best ever. It is funny, well-plotted, teasing, very friendly, but powerful, literate and big". Similarly, the review for ACE magazine also ended on a positive note: "Gnome Ranger has improved on Knight Orc in the puzzle stakes (more logical and enjoyable), the atmosphere (more enjoyable and less confusing), the plot (more comprehensible), and the characters (more interesting). You can't ask for much more than that".

References

External links

Gnome Ranger at Spectrum Computing

Gnome Ranger at Lemon Amiga
Gnome Ranger (Atari 8-bit) at Atari Mania
Gnome Ranger (Atari ST) at Atari Mania

1980s interactive fiction
1987 video games
Amiga games
Amstrad CPC games
Amstrad PCW games
Atari 8-bit family games
Atari ST games
BBC Micro and Acorn Electron games
Classic Mac OS games
Commodore 64 games
DOS games
Fantasy video games
Level 9 Computing games
MSX games
Video games about witchcraft
Video games developed in the United Kingdom
Video games featuring female protagonists
ZX Spectrum games